In the Croatian part of the Adriatic Sea, there are 718 islands, 389 islets and 78 reefs, making the Croatian archipelago the largest in the Adriatic Sea and the second largest in the Mediterranean Sea, after the Greek archipelago.

Of the 718 islands, only 47 are inhabited in the sense that at least one person resides on that island. Some sources indicate that Croatia has 67 inhabited islands, counting those that have a settlement, but 20 of those have lost all of their permanent population as a result of the population decline occurring throughout the Croatian islands due to insufficient economic activity.

The Adriatic islands have been populated at least since the time of Ancient Greece. For example, Hvar was already populated between 3500 BC and 2500 BC and Dionysius I of Syracuse founded a colony on Hvar and Vis in the 4th century BC. The combined island population reached its peak in 1921, at 173,503 inhabitants, and went into steady decline in the following decades, dropping to pre-1850s level by 1981. The depopulation trend was reversed only in the 1990s, with the 2001 census registering a population of 122,418, up from 110,953 in 1991.

The main industries on the islands are agriculture, fishing and tourism. The islands' agriculture is primarily devoted to viticulture and olive growing. The local economy is relatively underdeveloped while the cost of living is 10 to 30% higher than on the mainland, so the Croatian government provides various kinds of support and protection through its Islands Act to stimulate the economy of the islands, including charging no tolls on bridges, and providing discounted or free ferry tickets for islanders.

Islands

<onlyinclude>

See also
 List of islands of Croatia
 List of islands in the Adriatic

Notes

References

 
Croatia, List of inhabited islands of
Islands, inhabited